Phyllis Dorothy James, Baroness James of Holland Park,  (3 August 1920 – 27 November 2014), known professionally as P. D. James, was an English novelist and life peer. Her rise to fame came with her series of detective novels featuring the police commander and poet, Adam Dalgliesh.

Life and career 
James was born in Oxford, the daughter of Sidney Victor James, a tax inspector, and his wife, Dorothy Mary James. She was educated at the British School in Ludlow and Cambridge High School for Girls. Her mother was committed to a mental hospital when James was in her mid-teens.

She had to leave school at the age of sixteen to work to take care of her younger siblings, sister Monica, and brother Edward, because her family did not have much money and her father did not believe in higher education for girls. She worked in a tax office in Ely for three years and later found a job as an assistant stage manager for the Festival Theatre in Cambridge. She married Ernest Connor Bantry White (called "Connor"), an army doctor, on 8 August 1941. They had two daughters, Clare and Jane.

White returned from the Second World War mentally ill and was institutionalised. With her daughters being mostly cared for by Connor's parents, James studied hospital administration, and from 1949 to 1968 worked for a hospital board in London. She began writing in the mid-1950s, using her maiden name ("My genes are James genes").

Her first novel, Cover Her Face, featuring the investigator and poet Adam Dalgliesh of New Scotland Yard, was published in 1962. Dalgliesh's last name comes from a teacher of English at Cambridge High School and his first name is that of Miss Dalgliesh's father. Many of James's mystery novels take place against the backdrop of UK bureaucracies, such as the criminal justice system and the National Health Service, in which she worked for decades starting in the 1940s. Two years after the publication of Cover Her Face, James's husband died on 5 August 1964. Prior to his death, James had not felt able to change her job:  "He [Connor] would periodically discharge himself from hospital, sometimes at very short notice, and I never knew quite what I would have to face when I returned home from the office.  It was not a propitious time to look for promotion or for a new job, which would only impose additional strain.  But now [after Connor's death] I felt the strong need to look for a change of direction." She applied for the grade of Principal in the Home Civil Service and held positions as a civil servant within several sections of the Home Office, including the criminal section. She worked in government service until her retirement in 1979.

On 7 February 1991, James was created a life peer as Baroness James of Holland Park, of Southwold in the County of Suffolk. She sat in the House of Lords as a Conservative. She was an Anglican and a lay patron of the Prayer Book Society. Her 2001 work, Death in Holy Orders, displays her familiarity with the inner workings of church hierarchy. Her later novels were often set in a community closed in some way, such as a publishing house, barristers' chambers, a theological college, an island or a private clinic. Talking About Detective Fiction was published in 2009. Over her writing career, James also wrote many essays and short stories for periodicals and anthologies, which have yet to be collected. She revealed in 2011 that The Private Patient was the final Dalgliesh novel.

As guest editor of BBC Radio 4's Today programme in December 2009, James conducted an interview with the Director General of the BBC, Mark Thompson, in which she seemed critical of some of his decisions. Regular Today presenter Evan Davis commented that "She shouldn't be guest editing; she should be permanently presenting the programme." In 2008, she was inducted into the International Crime Writing Hall of Fame at the inaugural ITV3 Crime Thriller Awards.

In August 2014, James was one of 200 public figures who were signatories to a letter to The Guardian opposing Scottish independence in the run-up to September's referendum on that issue.

James' main home was her house at 58 Holland Park Avenue, in the area from which she took her title; she also owned homes in Oxford and Southwold.

James died at her home in Oxford on 27 November 2014, aged 94. She is survived by her two daughters, Clare and Jane, five grandchildren and eight great-grandchildren.

Film and television 
During the 1980s, many of James's mystery novels were adapted for television by Anglia Television for the ITV network in the UK. These productions have been broadcast in other countries, including the US on the PBS network. Roy Marsden played Adam Dalgliesh. According to James in conversation with Bill Link on 3 May 2001 at the Writer's Guild Theatre, Los Angeles, Marsden "is not my idea of Dalgliesh, but I would be very surprised if he were." The BBC adapted Death in Holy Orders in 2003, and The Murder Room in 2004, both as one-off dramas starring Martin Shaw as Dalgliesh. In Dalgliesh (2021), Bertie Carvel starred as the titular, enigmatic detective–poet. Six episodes, shown as three two-parters, premiered on Acorn TV on 1 November 2021 in the United States followed by a Channel 5 premiere on 4 November in the United Kingdom.

Her novel The Children of Men (1992) was the basis for the feature film Children of Men (2006), directed by Alfonso Cuarón and starring Clive Owen, Julianne Moore and Michael Caine. Despite substantial changes from the book, James was reportedly pleased with the adaptation and proud to be associated with the film.

A three episode adaptation, Death Comes to Pemberley, written by Juliette Towhidi, was made by Origin Pictures for BBC One. It was first shown in the UK over three nights from 26 December 2013 as part of the BBC's Christmas schedule and stars Anna Maxwell Martin as Elizabeth, Matthew Rhys as Mr Darcy, Jenna Coleman as Lydia and Matthew Goode as Wickham.

Books

Novels 
Adam Dalgliesh mysteries
Cover Her Face (1962)
A Mind to Murder (1963)
Unnatural Causes (1967)
Shroud for a Nightingale (1971)
The Black Tower (1975)
Death of an Expert Witness (1977)
A Taste for Death (1986)
Devices and Desires (1989)
Original Sin (1994)
A Certain Justice (1997)
Death in Holy Orders (2001)
The Murder Room (2003)
The Lighthouse (2005)
The Private Patient (2008)

Cordelia Gray mysteries
An Unsuitable Job for a Woman (1972)
The Skull Beneath the Skin (1982)

Miscellaneous novels
Innocent Blood (1980)
The Children of Men (1992)
Death Comes to Pemberley (2011)

Short stories
"Moment of Power" (1969), first published in Ellery Queen's Murder Menu (collected as "A Very Commonplace Murder" in The Mistletoe Murder and Other Stories, 2016)
"The Victim" (1973), first published in Winter's Crimes 5, ed. Virginia Whitaker (collected in Sleep No More: Six Murderous Tales, 2017)
"Murder, 1986" (1975), first published in Ellery Queen's Masters of Mystery
"A Very Desirable Residence" (1976), first published in Winter's Crimes 8, ed. Hilary Watson (collected in Sleep No More: Six Murderous Tales, 2017)
"Great-Aunt Ellie's Flypapers" (1979), first published in Verdict of Thirteen, ed. Julian Symons (collected as "The Boxdale Inheritance" in The Mistletoe Murder and Other Stories, 2016)
"The Girl Who Loved Graveyards" (1983), first published in Winter's Crimes 15, ed. George Hardinge (collected in Sleep No More: Six Murderous Tales, 2017)
"Memories Don't Die" (1984), first published in Redbook, July 1984
"The Murder of Santa Claus" (1984), first published in Great Detectives, ed. D. W. McCullough (collected in Sleep No More: Six Murderous Tales, 2017)
"The Mistletoe Murder" (1991), first published in The Spectator (collected in The Mistletoe Murder and Other Stories, 2016)
"The Man Who Was 80" (1992), first published in The Man Who, later revised as "Mr. Maybrick's Birthday" c. 2005 (collected as "Mr. Millcroft's Birthday" in Sleep No More: Six Murderous Tales, 2017)
"The Part-time Job" (2005), first published in The Detection Collection, ed. Simon Brett
"Hearing Ghote" (2006), first published in The Verdict of Us All, ed. Peter Lovesey. An earlier version of the story ("The Yo-Yo") written in 1996 was later published in Sleep No More: Six Murderous Tales in 2017.
"The Twelve Clues of Christmas" (collected in The Mistletoe Murder and Other Stories, 2016)

Omnibus editions
Crime Times Three (1979), later reprinted as Three Complete Novels (1988), comprising Cover Her Face, A Mind to Murder, and Shroud for a Nightingale
Murder in Triplicate (1980), later reprinted as In Murderous Company (1988), comprising Unnatural Causes, An Unsuitable Job for a Woman, and The Black Tower
Omnibus (1982), comprising Unnatural Causes, Shroud for a Nightingale and An Unsuitable Job for a Woman
Trilogy of Death (1984), comprising Innocent Blood, An Unsuitable Job for a Woman, and The Skull Beneath the Skin
A Dalgliesh Trilogy (1989), comprising Shroud for a Nightingale, The Black Tower, and Death of an Expert Witness
A Second Dalgliesh Trilogy (1993), comprising A Mind to Murder, A Taste for Death, and Devices and Desires
An Adam Dalgliesh Omnibus (2008), comprising A Taste for Death, Devices and Desires, and Original Sin

Non-fiction 
The Maul and the Pear Tree: The Ratcliffe Highway Murders, 1811 (1971), with Thomas A. Critchley
Time to Be in Earnest: A Fragment of Autobiography Faber & Faber, London 1999 
Talking About Detective Fiction (2009)

TV and film adaptations

Adam Dalgliesh series 
 Death of an Expert Witness (1983)
 Shroud for a Nightingale (1984)
 Cover Her Face (1985)
 The Black Tower (1985)
 A Taste For Death (1988)
 Devices and Desires (1991)
 Unnatural Causes (1993)
 A Mind to Murder (1995)
 Original Sin (1997)
 A Certain Justice (1998)
 Death in Holy Orders (2003)
 The Murder Room (2003)
 Dalgliesh (2021)

Other adaptations 
 An Unsuitable Job for a Woman (1982, 1997–1998, 1999–2001)
 Children of Men (feature film) (2006)
 Death Comes to Pemberley (2011)

Selected awards and honours

Honours 
 Officer of the Order of the British Empire, 1983
 Associate Fellow of Downing College, Cambridge, 1986
 Life peerage, Baroness James of Holland Park, of Southwold in the County of Suffolk, 7 February 1991
 Fellow of the Royal Society of Literature
 Fellow of the Royal Society of Arts
 President of the Society of Authors 1997–2013

Honorary doctorates
 University of Buckingham, 1992
 University of Hertfordshire, 1994
 University of Glasgow, 1995
 University of Essex, 1996
 University of Durham, 1998
 University of Portsmouth, 1999
 University of London, 1993

Honorary fellowships
 St Hilda's College, Oxford, 1996
 Girton College, Cambridge, 2000
 Downing College, Cambridge, 2000
 Kellogg College, Oxford
 Lucy Cavendish College, Cambridge, 2012

Awards 
 1971 Best Novel Award, Mystery Writers of America (runner-up): Shroud for a Nightingale
 1972 Crime Writers' Association (CWA) Macallan Silver Dagger for Fiction: Shroud for a Nightingale
 1973 Best Novel Award, Mystery Writers of America (runner-up): An Unsuitable Job for a Woman
 1976 CWA Macallan Silver Dagger for Fiction: The Black Tower
 1986 Mystery Writers of America Best Novel Award (runner-up): A Taste for Death
 1987 CWA Macallan Silver Dagger for Fiction: A Taste for Death
 1987 CWA Cartier Diamond Dagger (lifetime achievement award)
 1992 Deo Gloria Award: The Children of Men
 1992 The Best Translated Crime Fiction of the Year in Japan, Kono Mystery ga Sugoi! 1992: Devices and Desires
 1999 Grandmaster Award, Mystery Writers of America
 2002 WH Smith Literary Award (shortlist): Death in Holy Orders
 2005 British Book Awards Crime Thriller of the Year (shortlist): The Murder Room
 2010 Best Critical Nonfiction Anthony Award for Talking About Detective Fiction
 2010 Nick Clarke Award for interview with Director-General of the BBC Mark Thompson whilst guest editor of Today radio programme.

Interviews 
 
 The Guardian, 4-3-01. Accessed 2010-09-15
 The Sunday Herald newspaper (U.K.), 13-9-08. Accessed 2010-09-15
 CBC Radio hour-long interview by Eleanor Wachtel, 2000. Accessed 2 Aug. 2020
 The Globe and Mail (Canada), 30-1-09. Accessed 2010-09-15
 The Daily Telegraph newspaper (U.K.), 21-7-10. Accessed 2010-09-15
 The Independent newspaper (U.K.), 29-9-08. Accessed 2010-09-15
 The American Spectator magazine (U.S.), 4-1-10. Accessed 2010-09-15
 Extended audio discussion on Death Comes to Pemberley for the Faber website. Recorded October 2011.
 Video interview discussing Death Comes to Pemberley. Filmed October 2011.

References

Further reading 
 Gidez, Richard B. P. D. James. Twayne's English Authors Series. New York: Twayne, 1986.
 Hubly, Erlene. "Adam Dalgliesh: Byronic Hero." Clues: A Journal of Detection 3: 40–46.
 Joshi, S. T. "P. D. James: The Empress's New Clothes." In Varieties of Crime Fiction (Wildside Press, 2019) .
 Knight, Stephen. "The Golden Age". In The Cambridge Companion to Crime Fiction ed. by Martin Priestman, pp 77–94. (Cambridge University Press, 2003).
 Kotker, Joan G. "PD James's Adam Dalgliesh Series." in In the Beginning: First Novels in Mystery Series (1995): 139+
 Sharkey, Jo Ann. Theology in suspense: how the detective fiction of PD James provokes theological thought. (PhD Dissertation, University of St Andrews, 2011). online; with long bibliography
 Siebenheller, Norma. P. D. James. (New York: Ungar, 1981).
 Smyer, Richard L. "P.D. James: Crime and the Human Condition". Clues 3 (Spring/Summer 1982): 49–61.
 Wood, Ralph C. "A Case for P.D. James as a Christian Novelist". Theology Today 59.4 (January 2003): 583–595.
 Young, Laurel A. P. D. James: A Companion to the Mystery Fiction. Jefferson, NC: McFarland, 2017.

External links 

 The British Council's Contemporary Writers. Accessed 2016-08-03
 Faber and Faber (U.K.), publisher. Accessed 2010-09-15
 Random House (U.S.), publisher. Accessed 2010-09-15
 Penguin Books (U.K.), publisher. Accessed 2010-09-15
 
 
 "P.D. James (Baroness James of Holland Park OBE JP)", Fellows Remembered, The Royal Society of Literature.

1920 births
2014 deaths
Anglo-Catholic writers
Anthony Award winners
BBC Governors
British mystery writers
Cartier Diamond Dagger winners
Conservative Party (UK) life peers
Edgar Award winners
English Anglo-Catholics
English crime fiction writers
English women novelists
Fellows of Girton College, Cambridge
Fellows of the Royal Society of Literature
Life peeresses created by Elizabeth II
Literary peers
Macavity Award winners
Members of the Detection Club
Officers of the Order of the British Empire
People from Southwold
Pseudonymous women writers
Women mystery writers
Women science fiction and fantasy writers
Writers from Oxford
20th-century English novelists
20th-century English women writers
20th-century pseudonymous writers
Presidents of the Society of Authors